Sara Watle (better known as Sarita Watle) was a dancer, vedette, singer and actress of Argentine film, radio and theater. In 1937, she starred in her only film, El escuadrón azul. She was a protege of Battling Siki.

References

Bibliography
 Blanco Pazos, Roberto (2004). De la Fuga a la Fuga: Diccionario de Films Policiales. Buenos Aires: Corregidor. pp. 123. 

Argentine vedettes
Year of death missing
Year of birth missing